Chen Tianbao (Vietnamese: Trần Thiên Bảo) was a fisherman turned into powerful Chinese pirate operating from Guangdong and throughout the South China Sea in the late 1700s. Later he became a general and naval commander of Tay Son dynasty in Vietnam.

Chen was born to a fisherman's family in Lianzhou, Guangdong (modern Hepu County, Guangxi). In October 1780, his fishing vessel was shipwrecked near the northern Vietnam, and he had to stay there. 

The Tay Son brothers conquered northern Vietnam, he was forced to join the Tay Son army in 1783. He was very skillful at sailing and later appointed as general. He was the commander of Tay Son navy, helped Tay Son against the threats from the sea. From 1788 to 1799, he ordered his four subordinates, Mo Guanfu, Zheng Qi, Liang Wengeng (梁文庚) and Fan Wencai (樊文才), all Chinese pirates, to launch frequent attacks on the southern coast of Qing China.

Chen also played an important role during the civil war between Tay Son and Nguyen lords. After Tay Son army was utterly beaten by Nguyen lords in 1801, he fled to Guangdong and surrendered to Qing China. Jiaqing Emperor pardoned him because he was forced into piracy due Tay Son's forced conscription and allow him to  reside in Nanxiong which further away from the coastal areas.

See also
 Pirates of the South China Coast
 Tây Sơn military tactics and organization

References

External links
Hồ Bạch Thảo, Vua Quang Trung dự định đánh nhà Thanh

Chinese pirates
Tây Sơn dynasty generals
18th-century pirates